The 1911–12 Ottawa Hockey Club season was the club's 27th season, third in the National Hockey Association. The club did not repeat as league champion, placing second to Quebec, after a disputed game had to be replayed, and the Club lost the replay.

Regular season
Prior to the season, on November 2, Bruce Ridpath was seriously injured with a fractured skull after being hit by an automobile on Yonge Street in Toronto. He lived in Toronto and was rumoured to be a possible manager of the future Toronto NHA franchise.

The NHA changed its rules prior to the season. The rover position was dropped and teams played six-per-side. The change was protested by Ottawa, which had had great success playing seven-per-side. However, the NHA owners instead decided to drop the rover. Ottawa threatened to ice a seven-man team for a game against Quebec, but did not follow through on their threat.

Fred "Cyclone" Taylor went on public record stating that he would not play for Wanderers as he had a good position with the Interior Department in Ottawa, and would not play at all instead of playing for the Wanderers. Ottawa would attempt to secure his rights from Montreal. Ottawa would offer to trade Skene Ronan (who would go on to win the scoring championship) for Taylor but was turned down.

Highlights
On January 24, Fred Taylor played for Ottawa against the Wanderers, despite his rights being held by the Wanderers, for which he refused to play for. Ottawa would win the game, but it was protested and ordered replayed if necessary. This was Mr. Taylor's final game in the NHA, as he would join Vancouver the next year.

On February 9, Skene Ronan would score five goals in a game against the Wanderers and follow up with eight goals in a game against the Wanderers on February 14.

On March 2, Quebec defeated Ottawa 6–5 in a game decided after 23 minutes of overtime. With four seconds to play, Joe Malone scored to tie the game and Joe Hall scored the winning goal. Ottawa would now have to play the replay game against the Wanderers in Montreal. On March 5, Ottawa lost the replay, and the loss would cost them a tie of the league championship, as Quebec finished 10–8 and Ottawa would finish 9–9.

Final standings

Schedule and results

† Protested by Wanderers, replayed on March 5.

‡ Replay of protested game.

Player statistics

Goaltending averages

Leading scorers

See also
 1911–12 NHA season

References
 
 

Ottawa Senators (original) seasons
Ottawa Senators season, 1911-12